Alicia Roanne Witt (born August 21, 1975) is an American actress, singer and pianist. She first came to fame as a child actress after being discovered by David Lynch, who cast her in Dune (1984) and Twin Peaks (1990). Witt was a regular on Cybill Shepherd's sitcom Cybill (1995–1998) for four seasons, playing the title character's daughter, Zoe Woodbine. She had a critically acclaimed role as a disturbed teenager in Fun (1994), appeared as a music student in Mr. Holland's Opus (1995) and as a terrorized college student in the horror film Urban Legend (1998). She appeared in Cameron Crowe's Vanilla Sky (2001),  Two Weeks Notice (2002), Last Holiday (2006) and the thriller 88 Minutes (2007). Witt has made television appearances in The Walking Dead, The Sopranos, Nashville, Two and a Half Men, The Librarians, Friday Night Lights, Law & Order: Criminal Intent, The Mentalist, Justified, Twin Peaks: The Return, CSI: Miami, and Orange Is the New Black.

In addition to being in acting, Witt has been described as a musical prodigy; she is an accomplished pianist, singer, and songwriter. Witt has starred in eight annual Hallmark Christmas movies; the first one was broadcast in 2013. In her most recent film, Christmas Tree Lane (2020), she served as executive producer and storywriter. She also contributed two original songs, which her character sings on-screen.

Early life and education 
Witt was born on August 21, 1975, in Worcester, Massachusetts, to Diane (née Pietro), a junior high school reading teacher and Robert Witt, a science teacher and photographer. Her mother was an American and Guinness World Record holder for the longest hair, from 1989 to 1996. She has a brother, Ian. Talking by age two and reading by the age of four, Witt has been described as a child prodigy. Her acting talent was recognized by director David Lynch in 1980, when he heard her recite Shakespeare's Romeo and Juliet on the television show That's Incredible! at age five.  Lynch began working with her in film and television before Witt earned her high-school equivalency credential at age 14. From the ages of 10 to 14, Witt took four piano lessons a week, including from a Boston University professor, and competed nationally.

Career

Film and television 
Witt's discovery by Lynch led to his casting of the "flame-haired" child in the movie Dune (1984), as Paul Atreides's sister Alia; she turned eight during filming. She worked with Lynch again when she appeared in an episode of Twin Peaks, playing the younger sister of Lara Flynn Boyle's character Donna.

Her acting background led to small parts in Mike Figgis' Liebestraum in 1991 (her brother Ian also appears), the Gen-X drama Bodies, Rest & Motion (1993) and the TV movie The Disappearance of Vonnie (1994). In 1994, Witt landed her first lead role in a film, playing a disturbed, murderous teenager in Fun and receiving the Special Jury Recognition Award at the Sundance Film Festival. Witt was then cast in Four Rooms as Madonna's lover in the episode, "The Missing Ingredient".

Witt was introduced to a larger audience in the role of Cybill Shepherd's daughter, Zoey Woodbine, in the sitcom Cybill. While playing that part from 1995 to 1998, she also had film roles in Stephen Herek's Mr. Holland's Opus, Alexander Payne's Citizen Ruth, Robert Allan Ackerman's Passion's Way (based on the Edith Wharton novel, The Reef) and Richard Sears' comedy Bongwater. After Cybill was cancelled, Witt went on to leading roles in Jamie Blanks' horror film Urban Legend (1998), and in Kevin Altieri/Touchstone Pictures' limited-release animated feature, Gen¹³.

In 2000, Witt had starring roles on episodes of the television shows Ally McBeal and The Sopranos, the lead role in the Matthew Huffman comedy Playing Mona Lisa and a part in John Waters' Cecil B. Demented.

Next, she acted in a small part in Cameron Crowe's Vanilla Sky (2001). Witt played "Two", the college graduate discussing loss of her virginity, in Rodrigo García's Ten Tiny Love Stories and played the role of promiscuous Barbie, half-sister of the title character, in American Girl. Witt also appeared in Marc Lawrence's romantic comedy Two Weeks Notice (2002).

In 2003–04, she lived in the United Kingdom (during this time she portrayed Joan Allen's daughter in the U.S.-based comic drama The Upside of Anger). Between the two projects, Witt went to South Africa to shoot a film interpretation of the epic poem "Das Nibelungenlied", played one of the central characters, Kriemhild, in the German TV movie Kingdom in Twilight. Kingdom in Twilight has the title Dark Kingdom: The Dragon King in the U.S. and The Ring of the Nibelungs and The Sword of Xanten elsewhere.

Witt filmed the Last Holiday (2006) and the thriller 88 Minutes (2007) and joined the cast of Law & Order: Criminal Intent for the 2007–2008 season. In the latter she played Detective Nola Falacci, a character temporarily replacing Megan Wheeler as Detective Mike Logan's partner, who was away on maternity leave) and was a recurring character in the 2007–2008 season. Witt appeared in the role of Amy in the film Peep World (2010).

Witt appeared as the character Elaine Clayton in Cowgirls 'n Angels (2012), and in 2013, co-starred in the independent film Cold Turkey (opposite Peter Bogdanovich and Cheryl Hines); therein, she additionally performed an original musical piece over the end credits. Her dramatic performance in this film was critically acclaimed, with New York Magazines David Edelstein proclaiming her turn one of the top performances of 2013. She appeared in four Christmas films in 2013: the feature film Tyler Perry's A Madea Christmas, A Snow Globe Christmas for the Lifetime Channel and A Very Merry Mix-Up for the Hallmark Channel and in 2014, the Hallmark Channel's Christmas at Cartwright's. Also in 2014, Witt appeared in a guest-starring role on the DirecTV series, Kingdom, which aired that October.

In 2014, in the fifth season of the FX series Justified she played Wendy Crowe, the brightest member of a Floridian crime family that gets entangled in the show's events in Kentucky. In April 2016, Witt appeared in two episodes of the hit series The Walking Dead; the same month, it was announced that she would also be reprising her role as Gersten Hayward in the 2017 Twin Peaks series. Witt filmed a guest-starring role on season 12 of Supernatural as Lily Sunder, a former enemy of Castiel's. In 2019, she had a recurring role on the seventh season of Orange Is the New Black as Zelda.

Theater 
Witt made her stage debut in 2001, at Los Angeles' historic Tiffany Theater, in Robbie Fox's musical The Gift, in which she played a high-priced, albeit disease-carrying, stripper.

While in residence in the UK in 2004, she starred as Evelyn in a stage production of Neil LaBute's The Shape of Things at the New Ambassadors Theatre. In September 2006, Witt returned to the London stage at the Royal Court Theatre, in the critically well-received Piano/Forte, wherein she was "well-cast" in portraying the stammering, emotionally damaged pianist Abigail, sister to "unloved attention-seeker" Louise (Kelly Reilly).

Witt performed alongside Amber Tamblyn in Neil LaBute's play, Reasons to Be Pretty, at the Geffen Playhouse, which ran until August 31, 2014.

Music 

In addition to acting, Witt is a professional singer-songwriter and pianist, and is reported to have been a musical prodigy. She played piano at the restaurant at the Beverly Wilshire Hotel in the early/mid 1990s.

Responses to her 2006 stage portrayal of Abigail in Piano/Forte, which included scenes of piano-playing, noted her skill as an "outstanding pianist".

In 2009, Witt released her self-titled extended play album, followed by Live at Rockwood in 2012 and Revisionary History in 2015. In 2013, Witt and Ben Folds performed a song they had co-written on the soundtrack for the independent film Cold Turkey. The Nashville Scene said of Revisionary History: "Witt's new album Revisionary History is a piano-pop gem that sounds by turns like "Grey Seal"–era Elton John, an alt-universe Fiona Apple and a film-noir chanteuse notching her nights in cigarette burns on the fallboard."

In 2016, Witt joined the cast of ABC's Nashville in a recurring capacity playing established country singer Autumn Chase. Witt performed several songs throughout season four.

In August 2018, Witt released a five-song EP album titled 15,000 Days (a reference to the length of time she had been alive when she recorded the album) working with producer Jacquire King. She is currently finishing recording her new album, which she co-produced with Jordan Lehning and Bill Reynolds. Titled The Conduit, it was scheduled to be released in September (24th, most regions) of 2021.

In 2020, Witt released two new Christmas songs, as heard in her new Hallmark Christmas movie, Christmas Tree Lane. "Why Christmas" and "Christmas Will Never End" are performed on-screen by her character, music-store owner and songwriter Meg.

Other appearances 
In September 1990, Witt competed on Wheel of Fortune.

On June 14, 2004, Witt modeled what is believed to be the most expensive hat ever made, for Christie's auction house in London. The Chapeau d'Amour, designed by Louis Mariette, is valued at US$2.7 million and is encrusted in diamonds.

On October 5, 2021, Witt released a book called Small Changes: A Rules-Free Guide to Add More Plant-Based Foods, Peace & Power to Your Life.

Personal life 
On December 20, 2021, Witt's parents were found deceased in their Worcester home. Witt's parents' cause of death was revealed on February 24, 2022, as "probable cardiac dysrhythmia" due to the cold of their improperly heated home, which had been sorely neglected. In a Facebook post, Witt revealed that her parents were fiercely independent and refused any help with home repairs. In late May 2022, Witt revealed she had been diagnosed with, and treated for, breast cancer earlier that year.

Filmography

Film

Television

Stage credits

Accolades

References

External links 

 
 
 

1975 births
20th-century American actresses
20th-century American singers
21st-century American actresses
Actresses from Massachusetts
Actresses from Worcester, Massachusetts
American child actresses
Female models from Massachusetts
American film actresses
American women pianists
American stage actresses
American television actresses
American voice actresses
Boston University College of Fine Arts alumni
Contestants on American game shows
Living people
Musicians from Worcester, Massachusetts
Singers from Massachusetts
Sundance Film Festival award winners
20th-century American women singers
21st-century American singers
21st-century American women singers
21st-century American pianists